Cyperus bowmanni is a species of sedge that is native to parts of north eastern Australia.

See also 
 List of Cyperus species

References 

bowmanni
Plants described in 1878
Flora of Queensland
Taxa named by Ferdinand von Mueller